The 2023 Italian Athletics Championships will be the 113th edition of the Italian Athletics Championships and will take place in Molfetta, Apulia (Stadio di atletica Mario Saverio Cozzoli), from 28 to 30 July.

The Italian championships of the men's and women's 35 km racewalk took place in Milazzo on 29 January.

Champions

35 km walk (Milazzo, 29 January)

Cross country (Gubbio, 11-12 March)

10,000 m (Brescia, May)

20 km walk (Frosinone, 19 March)

See also
2023 Italian Athletics Indoor Championships

References

External links
  (35 km results)
 All results at FIDAL web site

Italian Athletics Championships
Athletics
Italian Athletics Outdoor Championships